Wilhelm "Willi" Ostermann (1 October 1876 – 6 August 1936) was a lyricist, composer and singer of carnival songs and songs about Cologne, primarily in the German dialect of Kölsch. The tune Homesick for Cologne is counted amongst his most famous pieces.

In the year 1949, a monument was erected to commemorate the life and works of Willi Ostermann in the Seven Mountains' Nightingale Valley of Königswinter.

References

 Thomas Liessem, Willi Ostermann. Leben und Wirken des rheinischen Volkslieddichters. Josef Höfer Köln, 1936. 2., veränderte Auflage 1951. Neuausgabe (um Noten erweitert) als: Willi Ostermann – Ein Leben für den Frohgesang am Rhein. Willi Ostermann Verlag Köln, 1958. .
 Wilhelm Staffel, Willi Ostermann. Greven Verlag Köln, 1976. .
 Hans W. Krupp, Willi Ostermann. Mundartdichter und Liedersänger. Stadt Köln [1986]. Neuausgabe als: Willi Ostermann. 'En Kölle am Rhing …'. Eine Biographie von Hans W. Krupp, neu herausgegeben von Anne Krupp. Wienand Verlag Köln, 1995. .

German lyricists
German composers
1876 births
1936 deaths